Low Island or Isla Baja, historical names Jameson Island or Jamesons Island is an island  long and  wide,  southeast of Smith Island, in the South Shetland Islands. Low Island was so named because of its low elevation. Low Island was known to sealers in 1820, and the name Low Island has been established in international usage for 100 years.

Chinstrap Penguins breed at Cape Garry on Low island resulting in 2nd largest Chinstrap Penguin colony on the island, over at 100,000 pairs.

See also
 Composite Antarctic Gazetteer
 List of Antarctic islands south of 60° S
 SCAR
 South Shetland Islands
 Territorial claims in Antarctica

Maps
 Chart of South Shetland including Coronation Island, &c. from the exploration of the sloop Dove in the years 1821 and 1822 by George Powell Commander of the same. Scale ca. 1:200000. London: Laurie, 1822.
 South Shetland Islands: Smith and Low Islands. Scale 1:150000 topographic map No. 13677. British Antarctic Survey, 2009.

References

External links
 Low Island. SCAR Composite Antarctic Gazetteer

Islands of the South Shetland Islands